The soundtrack to The Mambo Kings is a solid effort that effectively conveys the atmosphere inherent in the film, which was based on Oscar Hijuelos’s Pulitzer Prize-winning novel, The Mambo Kings Play Songs of Love.  Assembled here is a selection of mambos, rumbas, boleros and cha cha chas performed by stellar artists of the Latin scene including Tito Puente, Celia Cruz, Benny Moré, Johnny Pacheco and Arturo Sandoval mixed with well-known performers with roots in the form like Linda Ronstadt and Los Lobos. Besides this, the Mambo All-Stars are a high energy dance band composed of top studio sidemen from New York City and Los Angeles. With only a couple of exceptions, the tracks were cut specially for the film and as such, add a novel, accurately reflecting the Cuban music sound of the 1950s. The 2000 Elektra updated edition adds a remix of Tito Puente's "Ran Kan Kan" by Olga Tañón and a rendition of "Beautiful Maria of My Soul" featuring Antonio Banderas and legendary crooner Compay Segundo of Buena Vista Social Club fame.

Track listing

Arrangements

Chart performance

Album certification

Credits
Robert Kraft, producer
Steve Ralbovsky, executive producer
Robin Urdang, music coordinator
Thomas Drescher, supervising music editor
Michael Golub, recording engineer and mixing
Michael Farrow, recording engineer and mixing
Frank Wolf, recording engineer
Dan Stein, technical assistant
Recorded at:
Soundtrack Studios (NY)
Skyline Studios (NY)
BMG Recording Studio (NY)
Clinton Studio (NY)
Capitol Recording Studio (LA)
Mastered by:
Greg Calbi at Sterling Sound (NY)
Oscar Hijuelos, liner notes

Awards nominations
Academy Award
Beautiful Maria of My Soul (best music, original song)
Robert Kraft (music)
Arne Glimcher (lyrics)
Golden Globes
Beautiful Maria of My Soul (best original song, motion picture)
Robert Kraft (music)
Arne Glimcher (lyrics)
Grammy Awards
Mambo Caliente (best instrumental composition for a motion picture)
Arturo Sandoval (composer, arranger and performer)
Alberto Naranjo (orchestrator)
Beautiful Maria of My Soul (best original song for a motion picture)
Robert Kraft (music)
Arne Glimcher (lyrics)
Antonio Banderas (performer)
Ray Santos (arranger)

See also
List of number-one Billboard Tropical Albums from the 1990s

References

External links
[ AMG]
IMDb entry

1992 soundtrack albums
Tropical music soundtracks
Spanish-language soundtracks
Musical film soundtracks
Drama film soundtracks